"Have a Little Faith (In Us)" (sometimes known as simply Have a Little Faith) is a song by Australian pop rock singer John Farnham. It was released in March 1996 as the lead single from his 16th studio album Romeo's Heart. The song peaked at number 3 on the ARIA Charts.

Track listing
 Australian CD/7" single
 "Have a Little Faith (In Us)" - 5:08	
 "Have a Little Faith (In Us)" (Acoustic version) - 5:01	
 "Cool Water" - 3:58

Charts

References

1996 singles
1996 songs
John Farnham songs
Songs written by Arnie Roman
RCA Records singles
Songs written by Russ DeSalvo